Richard Lee Murphy (October 25, 1931 – December 12, 2020) was an American professional baseball player who played for three seasons (1954; 1957–1958) and had a six-game trial with the  Cincinnati Redlegs of Major League Baseball.

Murphy attended Ohio University, where he was an All-American as an outfielder. He signed with his hometown Redlegs on June 12, 1954, and made his Major League debut the following day against the Brooklyn Dodgers at Crosley Field. In his only MLB plate appearance, he pinch hit for Cincinnati relief pitcher Jackie Collum against Brooklyn lefthander Johnny Podres and struck out. After a short tenure in minor league baseball, Murphy returned to the Redlegs that September and served as a pinch runner in five more games, scoring his only Major League run in his last appearance on September 13.  He then spent two seasons in military service before resuming his minor league career in the Redleg farm system in 1957 and 1958. He retired after the latter campaign with a .192 career batting average and four home runs.

References

External links

1931 births
2020 deaths
Albuquerque Dukes players
Baseball players from Cincinnati
Cincinnati Redlegs players
Columbia Reds players
Havana Sugar Kings players
Nashville Vols players
Ohio Bobcats baseball players
Savannah Redlegs players
American expatriate baseball players in Cuba